Floodtide is a British television crime drama was produced by Granada Television, first broadcast on ITV from 14 June 1987 to 12 February 1988. The series focuses on a dogged inspector's pursuit of a group of cocaine smugglers across Europe and his bid to bring them to justice. A total of thirteen episodes aired over the course of nine months. Co-produced and partly filmed in France, it was one of the first ITV dramas to be co-produced with an international production company. Written by acclaimed The Sweeney scriptwriter Roger Marshall, the series was released on DVD by Network on 19 July 2010.

Although further series of the programme were planned, lead actor Phillip Sayer was diagnosed with cancer in 1988 and eventually died in 1989. Marshall concluded that it would be wrong to re-cast the part and instead decided to bring the series to a natural close.

Cast
 Phillip Sayer as Dr. Thomas 'Tommy' Ramsey
 John Benfield as Detective Inspector Brook
 Sybil Maas as Dany Lombárd 
 Georges Trillat as Pascal Lambért
 Gaby Dellal as Tessa Waite
 Connie Booth as Isabel Palmer
 Oliver Pages as Marcel Joubert
 Linda Marlowe as Beryl Waite 
 Alfred Lynch as P.F.
 Eric Denize as Tailman 
 Raoul Delfosse as Serge Costo
 Wylie Longmore as Malone Foster
 Malcolm Scates as Detective Sergeant Ward 
 Sarah Martin as Kath Parrock
 David Fielder as Detective Sergeant Jackman

Episodes

Series 1 (1987)

Series 2 (1988)

References

External links

1987 British television series debuts
1988 British television series endings
1980s British drama television series
1980s British crime television series
ITV television dramas
English-language television shows
Serial drama television series
Television series by ITV Studios
Television shows produced by Granada Television
Television shows set in France